The 149th Infantry Regiment was an infantry regiment of the United States Army, provided by the Kentucky Army National Guard. It was originally constituted 22 May 1846 in the Kentucky Militia as the 1st Kentucky Cavalry and the 2d Kentucky Volunteer Infantry. After a year of Federal service (June 1846 to June 1847), it was reorganized on 15 June 1860 in the Kentucky State Guard as the Lexington Battalion (which included the Lexington Rifles). It was then expanded in November 1860 to comprise the Lexington Battalion and the Kentucky River Battalion. The Lexington and Kentucky River Battalions, antecedents to the 149th Infantry, are especially notable in military history in that they were some of the few military units to ever be split between two different countries for the duration of a war.

Service career

American Civil War
In 1861, after the outbreak of the American Civil War, the 149th Infantry Regiment (at the time part of the Kentucky State Militia and comprising the Lexington Battalion and the Kentucky River Battalion), was split between the Union and the Confederacy by the Kentucky General Assembly. The reason for this was the Kentucky State Government had declared neutrality in the war. They were officially recognized as part of both countries, and, although Kentucky never officially seceded from the United States, many soldiers within the state militia held Confederate sympathies. This was made more complicated when President Abraham Lincoln began drafting soldiers to fight the Confederacy, as they needed military units to join. To prevent the collapse of the Kentucky State Militia, the General Assembly voted to split the entire militia in half. This included the antecedents of the 149th Infantry Regiment. Between April–June 1861, soldiers with Union sympathies were reorganized as the 1st and 2nd Volunteer Kentucky Infantry regiments, while soldiers with Southern sympathies were reorganized into the 1st Kentucky Brigade (The Orphan Brigade).

The two halves of the Kentucky Militia only fought each other once, at the Battle of Shiloh.

World War I
The history of the unit designated the 149th Infantry goes back to April 28, 1917. But the History of the 149th Infantry correctly states that, as the 2nd Kentucky, the regiment had many years of service before 1917.

The 38th Division deployed to Europe in October 1918, where it landed in France at the height of the German "Peace Offensives". Because the division was not combat ready, it was largely stripped of officers and men, who served as replacements for units already in combat. The 149th Infantry Regiment was broken up in this way to provide replacements.

World War II
The 149th Infantry Regiment was in federal service from 7 January 1941, to 9 November 1945.

Status today
The military unit has been active in the Louisville, Kentucky area since the 149th Infantry Regiment Combat Team was activated after World War II. The U.S. Army Center for Military History attributes lineage and honors to the Louisville unit further back than that.

It has the Special Designation 'Second Kentucky', commemorating its previous state designation. The numerical designation, but not the lineage or honors, is now carried on in the 149th Maneuver Enhancement Brigade.

References

Infantry regiments of the United States Army
Military units and formations established in 1917
Military units and formations in Kentucky
1917 establishments in Kentucky
Infantry regiments of the United States Army National Guard
Organizations based in Louisville, Kentucky